Thomas Leslie Brierley (15 June 1910 – 7 January 1989) was an English and Canadian cricketer. He was a right-handed batsman and a wicket-keeper. A curiosity of his county career is that his highest career score (116) was scored twice, one playing for Glamorgan, and once playing against Glamorgan.

Before the Second World War, Brierley played his county cricket for Glamorgan. After the war he moved to play for Lancashire playing for three seasons before emigrating to Canada. He took up posts as a coach with Vancouver Cricket Club, and as groundsman and economics teacher at Shawnigan Lake School.

He was considered to be one of the leading cricket coaches in Canada, and continued playing, winning a place in the Canadian national team. He played five further first-class matches for Canada in the 1950s, including a return to the UK in 1954 as part of a Canadian touring team.

References
Cricket Archive profile
Wisden Almanack obituaries for 1989
Cricinfo profile

1910 births
1989 deaths
Canadian cricketers
English cricketers
Glamorgan cricketers
Lancashire cricketers
Wicket-keepers